Yarnell may refer to:


Places in the United States
 Yarnell, Arizona
 Yarnell, Oregon
 Yarnell, Pennsylvania
 Yarnell, Wisconsin

People with the name Yarnell
 Carolyn Yarnell (born 1961), American composer and visual artist
 Jesse Yarnell (1837–1906), American journalist
 Harry E. Yarnell (1875–1959), American naval officer
 Lorene Yarnell (1944–2010), actress and mime artist

Other
 Yarnell Ice Cream Co.

See also
 
 Yarnall, a surname